The 1966–67 Hellenic Football League season was the 14th in the history of the Hellenic Football League, a football competition in England.

Premier Division

The Premier Division featured 15 clubs which competed in the division last season, along with three new clubs:
Banbury United reserves
Marston United, promoted from Division One
Princes Risborough Town, promoted from Division One

League table

Division One

The Division One featured 13 clubs which competed in the division last season, along with 3 new club:
Kidlington, relegated from the Premier Division
Abingdon Town, relegated from the Premier Division
Pinehurst

League table

References

External links
 Hellenic Football League

1966-67
H